Pure Energy may refer to:

Energy
Pure Energy Services Ltd., owner of Canadian Sub-Surface oil field services, acquired by FMC Technologies
Pure Energy, licensee of Rechargeable alkaline battery technology
Pure Planet, a former energy company in England

People
Mr Pure Energy, Gary David
Mr Pure Energy, Gary Valenciano

Music
Pure Energy (band), an American music group
PureNRG, pronounced "pure energy", an American Christian band

Albums
Pure Energy (Information Society album), a 2004 compilation
Pure Energy 1996 album by Steve Marriott

Songs
"What's On Your Mind (Pure Energy)", a 1988 song by Information Society
"Pure Energy", 1985 song by Five Star written by Stedman Pearson